Knightly may refer to:

 Knight, a person granted an honorary title of knighthood
 Knightly Piety, a specific strand of Christian belief espoused by knights during the Middle Ages
 Knightly sword, a straight, double-edged weapon with a single-handed, cruciform hilt and a blade length of about 70 to 80 centimetres
 Knightly Chetwood (1650–1720), Anglican priest, poet, and translator

See also
 Knightley (disambiguation)